John Henry Pruitt (October 4, 1896 – October 4, 1918) was a United States Marine during World War I and is one of only 19 people who have received two Medals of Honor.

Biography 
John Henry Pruitt was born on October 4, 1896, in Fayetteville, Arkansas. He entered military service from Phoenix, Arizona, in May 1917.

As a corporal in the Marine Corps, Pruitt attacked and captured two enemy machine guns, and later captured forty of the enemy. The U.S. Army and later the U.S. Navy awarded him the Medal of Honor for his bravery on October 3, 1918, at the Battle of Blanc Mont Ridge, France. The next day, his 22nd birthday, he was killed by shell-fire.

His remains were returned to the United States and was buried at Arlington National Cemetery, in Arlington, Virginia.

Military awards

Medal of Honor

Army citation

Navy citation

Namesake 
The United States Navy named a destroyer  in his honor and he was listed in Pershing's 100. Pruitt Hall on Marine Corps Base Quantico is named for him.

Decorations 
Pruitt's military decorations and awards include:

See also 
 List of Medal of Honor recipients for World War I

References

Footnotes

Sources

External links 
 
 

1896 births
1918 deaths
United States Marine Corps personnel of World War I
American military personnel killed in World War I
Burials at Arlington National Cemetery
Double Recipients of the Medal of Honor
People from Fayetteville, Arkansas
Recipients of the Croix de Guerre 1914–1918 (France)
Recipients of the Silver Star
United States Marine Corps Medal of Honor recipients
United States Marine Corps non-commissioned officers
World War I recipients of the Medal of Honor
Military personnel from Arkansas